"My Lover's Prayer" is a song performed by the Bee Gees, written by Barry Gibb, Robin Gibb and Maurice Gibb, and was released in 1997 on the album Still Waters. The track was originally written and recorded in 1995, but it was only a demo.

In 2003, it was recorded by Alistair Griffin featuring Robin Gibb and was released as a double A-side.

Personnel

 Barry Gibb - lead vocals
 Robin Gibb - lead vocals
 Maurice Gibb - backing vocals
 Robbie Kondor - keyboard, arranger
 Rob Mounsey - keyboard
 Marc Schulman - guitar
 Anthony Jackson - bass
 Russ Titelman - arranger
 Arif Mardin - strings arrangement
 Steve Eigner - sound engineer
 Mike Viola - sound engineer

Alistair Griffin and Robin Gibb version

"My Lover's Prayer" was released as a single in 2003 by Alistair Griffin featuring Robin Gibb, as a double A-side with "Bring It On".

Robin Gibb had intended to re-release the song as a solo single in 2003 with backing vocals by Lance Bass and Wanya Morris, and a promo version of this had already been given radio play. However, the morning after the Fame Academy 2 final, Gibb contacted Griffin with a request to re-record a duet of the song, with the apparent intention of releasing it as a Christmas single. This version also used Gibb's original vocals with a new edit of the instrumental track. Three other performers from Fame Academy 2, Peter Brame, Carolynne Good and winner Alex Parks sang the backing vocals.

Personnel
 Robin Gibb - lead vocals
 Wanya Morris - backing vocals (first version)
 Lance Bass - backing vocals (first version)
 Alistair Griffin - lead vocals (second version)
 Peter Brame - backing vocals (second version)
 Carolynne Good - backing vocals (second version)
 Alex Parks - backing vocals (second version)
 Deconzo Smith - keyboards, guitar, bass, producer
 Olly Meacock - programming
 Dave Ford - sound engineer
 Ian Curnow - producer

References

1997 songs
Bee Gees songs
Songs written by Barry Gibb
Songs written by Robin Gibb
Songs written by Maurice Gibb
2003 singles
Robin Gibb songs
Alistair Griffin songs